Hackberry Mountain is a mountain summit on the south of Lanfair Valley in eastern San Bernardino County, California.

References

Mountains of San Bernardino County, California